The Sardinian Ethnographic Museum , is an ethnographic museum in Nuoro, Sardinia. Its goal is to display the traditional life of the island's people.

History
The museum building was built between the 1950s and the 1960s on the :it:Colle di Sant'Onofrio, designed by architect :it:Antonio Simon Mossa to resemble an imaginary Sardinian village.

Collection
The museum exhibits show all aspects of the material culture of the traditional Sardinian including clothes, jewels, weapons, masks, traditional musical instruments, work and domestic tools. The collection includes over 8000 items, most of them belonging to the period between the end of the 19th century and the first half of the 20th century.

Included in the collection are traditional male and female outfits, around 80 in total; each of them representing a different village in Sardinia. These outfits are authentic and were in everyday use until they were acquired by the museum.

Notes

National museums of Italy
Ethnographic museums in Italy
Folk art museums and galleries
Museums in Sardinia